Mixes may refer to:
 Mixe people, an ethnic group of Mexico
 a form of the word mix, see Mix (disambiguation)
 DJ mixes, a sequence of music tracks
 Mixes (Kylie Minogue album), the 1998 remix album by Australian singer-songwriter Kylie Minogue
 Mixes (Transvision Vamp album), 1992
 Mixes, a 2008 album by C418

See also 
 Mixis, a genus of orchids